The following is a timeline of the history of the city of Nouakchott, Mauritania.

20th century

 1903 - French military outpost built.
 1908 - Military outpost abandoned.
 1929 - French military outpost reactivated.
 1952 - Rosso-Nouakchott highway constructed.
 1958
 Nouakchott site designated new capital of Mauritania; building of city begins.
 Radio de Mauritanie begins broadcasting.
 1960
 Capital of newly independent Mauritania moved to Nouakchott from Saint Louis.
 AS Garde Nationale (football club) formed.
 Palais de Justice (courthouse) built.
 1961
 National Institute of Advanced Islamic Studies built.
 Population: 5,807.
 1965 - Population: 15,000 (estimate).
 1966 - National School of Administration built.
 1968 - Racial unrest.
 1970
  (school) founded.
 Population: 25,000.
 1973 - ASC Police (football club) formed.
 1974
 Refugees from drought settle in Qsar Gadid.
 5th and 6th arrondissements created.
 1975
 "25 miles of city streets were paved....Street lights were installed and bus service started."
 Convention centre constructed near city.
 Population: 104,054 (of which 54,000 living in shanty towns).
 1976
 June: City besieged by guerrilla Polisario Front forces.
  football club formed.
 1977
 July: City besieged by guerrilla Polisario Front forces again.
 Population: 134,704 (of which 81,467 living in shanty towns).
 1978
 Coup d'état.
 ACS Ksar (football club) formed.
 1979 - ASAC Concorde (football club) formed.
 1980 - ASC Nasr Zem Zem (football club) formed.
 1981
 Coup d'état.
 University of Nouakchott established.
 National Archives, and National Library built.
 Population: at least 232,000.
 1983 - Stade Olympique (stadium) opens.
 1984 - Coup d'état.
 1986 - Friendship Port of Nouakchott opens.
 1987 - Racial unrest.
 1988 - Population: 393,325.
 1989 - Curfew imposed in city after regional ethnic unrest.
 1991 - 1 June: Windstorm.
 1994 - La Calame newspaper begins publication.
 1995
 "Bread riot" occurs.
 Al-Akhbar and Nouakchott Info newspapers begin publication.
 1996 - Coup d'état.
 1999 -  in business.
 2000 - Population: 558,195.

21st century
 2003 - June: Coup attempted and suppressed. 
 2004 - Plague of locusts.
 2005
 June: Anti-government protest.
 3 August: 2005 Mauritanian coup d'état.
 2008 - Population: 846,871 (estimate).
 2011
 January: 2011–12 Mauritanian protests begin.
 2 February: "Al Qaeda suspects killed in...car blast."
  (school) established.
 2012 - 12 July: Airplane crash occurs at Nouakchott International Airport.
 2013 - Population: 958,399.
 2014
 March: Protest over Koran desecration.
 Maty Mint Hamady becomes mayor.
 Administrative regions Nouakchott-Nord, Nouakchott-Ouest, and Nouakchott-Sud created.
 2016
 Nouakchott–Oumtounsy International Airport opens; Nouakchott International Airport closes.
 June: 2016 Arab League summit held in Nouakchott.

See also
 Nouakchott history (de)

References

This article incorporates information from the French Wikipedia.

Bibliography

in English
  
 
 
  (Photos of Nouakchott)
 

in French

External links

  (Bibliography)
 
  (Bibliography of open access  articles)
  (Images, etc.)
  (Images, etc.)
  (Bibliography)
  (Bibliography)

Images

Nouakchott
Nouakchott
History of Mauritania
Years in Mauritania
Mauritania history-related lists
Nouakchott